John Wallace Morris (born August 23, 1941) is an American former Major League Baseball pitcher.

Morris was born in Lewes, Delaware, and graduated from Lewes High School. He signed with the nearby Phillies in 1960, played 5 years in their farm system, and made his MLB debut in July 1966. He appeared in 13 games through the end of September, going 1–1 with a 5.27 ERA. He spent all of 1967 back in Triple-A, then was traded to Baltimore that off-season. In , Morris made 19 relief appearances for the Orioles, posting a 2–0 record and a 2.56 ERA. That autumn, he was selected in the American League expansion draft by the fledgling Seattle Pilots. 

Morris split his  season between Seattle and Triple-A, but the following year, when Pilots had become the Milwaukee Brewers, he spent the first of two straight years as a full-season major leaguer. Morris was a Brewer for 69 games, more than half of his MLB appearances, and threw his only two complete games; they happened in two consecutive starts in May 1970, on the 13th against the New York Yankees, a three-hit, 3–1 triumph, and the 19th against the Oakland Athletics, a 6–3 win over Catfish Hunter. Traded to the Giants after the  season, he appeared in 31 total games over three seasons (–1974).

In 132 MLB games, he posted an 11–7 won–lost record, with two saves. He allowed 227 hits and 86 walks in 232 innings pitched, with 137 strikeouts.

References

External links
, or Retrosheet
Pura Pelota (Venezuelan Winter League)

1941 births
Living people
Arkansas Travelers players
Baltimore Orioles players
Baseball players from Delaware
Chattanooga Lookouts players
Des Moines Demons players
Elmira Pioneers players
Indianapolis Indians players
Johnson City Phillies players
Magic Valley Cowboys players
Major League Baseball pitchers
Milwaukee Brewers players
Navegantes del Magallanes players
American expatriate baseball players in Venezuela
People from Lewes, Delaware
Philadelphia Phillies players
Phoenix Giants players
San Diego Padres (minor league) players
San Francisco Giants players
Seattle Pilots players
Vancouver Mounties players